Isabelita is the diminutive of the name Isabel. It may refer to:

Isabelita (film), a 1940 Argentine comedy film directed by Manuel Romero
Isabel Perón, President of Argentina and the third wife of Juan Perón, commonly known by the diminutive "Isabelita"
Isabelita Blanch, Argentine actress

See also
 Isabel (disambiguation)